Saint Osmanna (or Agariarga) was said to be a virgin of Irish royal origin who lived alone in the woods near the mouth of the Loire in France, performed many miracles of healing, and came to be considered a saint. Her story may have little basis in fact.
Her feast day is 9 September.

Life

Osmanna probably lived in the 6th or 7th century.
She was said to have been from a royal family of Ireland, and was brought up as a pagan.
She did not want to marry the man her parents chose for her, so left Ireland for France to live alone (apart from a maidservant) in woods near the Loire river.
A wild boar that was being hunted took refuge with her, and the hunter found her.
The local bishop persuaded her to learn the Christian faith, accept baptism and become a virgin dedicated to God.
She continued to live alone, and cured several people by prayer.

After her death, her place of burial in Jotrum (Jouarre Abbey), near Meaux, was the scene of many miracles.
A church was built over the site of her hermitage, and later an oratory was built nearby, the center of the parish of Sainte-Osmane.
For many centuries the Abbey Church of Saint Denis, near Paris, held a large part of her relics.
A chapel there was dedicated to the saint, and her remains were held in an iron shrine. richly gilt.
During the Calvinist upheavals of 1567 her relics were profaned and dispersed, and any remaining relics in the Abbey were removed in 1793 during the French Revolution.
The saint is venerated in Paris, Saint-Brieuc and Le Mans.
Her feast day is 9 September.
Her story may be mythical.

Butler's account

The hagiographer Alban Butler (1710–1773) wrote in his Lives of the Fathers, Martyrs, and Other Principal Saints,

O'Hanlon's account

John O'Hanlon (1821-1905) thought that Osmanna's true acts were probably mixed with "obscurities, uncertainties and fables".
He wrote that "...although some old Lives of her are extant, they are negligently and injudiciously composed, while they are of a character not to merit implicit belief."
He then summarized her story as follows,

Notes

Citations

Sources

 

 

Female saints of medieval Ireland
Female saints of medieval France
7th-century deaths